David Pinhusovich Milman (15 January 1912, Chechelnyk near Vinnytsia – 12 July 1982, Tel Aviv) was a Soviet and later Israeli mathematician specializing in functional analysis. He was one of the major figures of the Soviet school of functional analysis. In the 70s he emigrated to Israel and was on the faculty of Tel Aviv University.

Milman is known for his development of functional analysis methods, particularly in operator theory, in close connection with concrete problems coming from mathematical physics, in particular differential equations and normal modes. The Krein–Milman theorem and the Milman–Pettis theorem are named after him.

Milman received his Ph.D. from Odessa State University in 1939 under direction of Mark Krein. 
 
He is the father of the mathematicians Vitali Milman and Pierre Milman; and the grandfather to the mathematician Emanuel Milman and biochemist Pavel Milman.

Notes

External links

1912 births
1982 deaths
20th-century Israeli mathematicians
Ukrainian Jews
20th-century Israeli Jews
Soviet mathematicians
Academic staff of Tel Aviv University
Functional analysts
Soviet emigrants to Israel
Academic staff of K. D. Ushinsky South Ukrainian National Pedagogical University